The Al-Awqaf Library is a library located near the Iraq National Library and Archive. It held about 5,000 Islamic manuscripts. It was looted and burnt in the 2003 Iraq War.

See also 
 Destruction of libraries

References 

Libraries in Iraq
Defunct libraries
Islamic libraries
Libraries disestablished in 2003
2003 disestablishments in Iraq